The 1940 United States presidential election in Maryland took place on November 5, 1940, as part of the 1940 United States presidential election. State voters chose eight representatives, or electors, to the Electoral College, who voted for president and vice president.

Maryland was won by incumbent President Franklin D. Roosevelt (D–New York), running with Secretary of Agriculture Henry A. Wallace, with 58.25% of the popular vote, against Wendell Willkie (R–New York), running with Minority Leader Charles L. McNary, with 40.83% of the popular vote.

This is the first time since 1880 that a Democrat carried ancestrally Federalist Calvert County, and would be the only instance during the 80 years between 1880 and 1960 that a Democrat would carry the county. It was only the fourth time that the party carried the county overall, despite it having participating in every single election since the creation of the Democratic Party. The others were 1864, 1868, and the aforementioned 1880. 

Maryland weighed in for this election as Roosevelt’s strongest performance in any of the antebellum Union States. In this election, Maryland voted 7.47% to the left of the nation at-large.

Results

Results by county

Counties that flipped from Republican to Democratic
Calvert
Somerset

Counties that flipped from Democratic to Republican
Harford
Talbot

See also
 United States presidential elections in Maryland
 1940 United States presidential election
 1940 United States elections

Notes

References 

Maryland
1940
Presidential